The Morning Sun Community School District is a public school district headquartered in Morning Sun, Iowa.  The district is mostly in southern Louisa County, with a smaller area in Des Moines County, and serves the town of Morning Sun and the surrounding rural areas.

Mike Peterson, superintendent of Wapello, serves as superintendent.

Schools
The district operates a single elementary school in Stratford:
 Morning Sun Elementary School

Students from Morning Sun attend secondary school at Winfield-Mt. Union or Wapello.

Enrollment

References

External links
 Morning Sun Community School District

School districts in Iowa
Education in Louisa County, Iowa
Education in Des Moines County, Iowa